Erik Madsen (born 5 February 1946) is a Danish boxer. He competed in the men's lightweight event at the 1972 Summer Olympics. At the 1972 Summer Olympics, he lost to Charlie Nash of Ireland.

References

External links
 

1946 births
Living people
Danish male boxers
Olympic boxers of Denmark
Boxers at the 1972 Summer Olympics
Sportspeople from Copenhagen
Lightweight boxers